Mam or MAM may refer to:

Places
 An Mám or Maum, a settlement in Ireland
 General Servando Canales International Airport in Matamoros, Tamaulipas, Mexico (IATA Code: MAM)
 Isle of Mam, a phantom island
 Mam Tor, a hill near Castleton in the High Peak of Derbyshire, England

Cultures
 Mam people, an indigenous Maya people in Guatemala
 Mam language, a Mayan language spoken in Guatemala

People
 Michèle Alliot-Marie (or MAM, born 1946), French Minister of Foreign Affairs
 Mam Jokmok, Thai comedian
 Somaly Mam (born 1970s), anti-trafficking advocate who founded the Somaly Mam Foundation

Arts, entertainment, and media
 Mam (film), a 2010 British short film
 Mam and Zin (1692), a Kurdish classic love story 
 MAM Records, a record label

Computing and technology
 Media asset management, of digital media
 Media Auxiliary Memory
 Mobile application management

Museums
 Macau Museum of Art, China
 Museo de Arte Moderno, Mexico
 Miami Art Museum. US
 Midland Air Museum, Warwickshire, England
 Milwaukee Art Museum, US
 Montclair Art Museum, New Jersey, U.S.
 Montreal Aviation Museum, Canada

Protests
 Movement Against the Monarchy, UK

Science and healthcare
 6-Monoacetylmorphine or 6-MAM, a metabolite of heroin
 Medicine-assisted manipulation in medicine
 Methylazoxymethanol, a carcinogen
 Methylazoxymethanol acetate, a neurotoxin
 Mitochondria-associated ER-membrane

Other uses
 Mam, term for mother in some English-speaking regions
 Welsh Mam
Geordie
 Maximum authorised mass of a road vehicle
MAM (Smart Micro Munition) is a laser-guided smart munition system under production by Turkish defence industry manufacturer ROKETSAN.

See also
 Ma'am
 "Mam'selle"